Ectoedemia preisseckeri is a moth of the family Nepticulidae. It is found from the Czech Republic and Slovakia to Italy and Greece.

The wingspan is 5-6.6 mm. Adults are on wing in May and June. There is one generation per year.

The larvae feed on Ulmus campestris and Ulmus laevis. They mine the leaves of their host plant. The mine consists of a narrow, contorted corridor with a broad, but often long interrupted frass line, which widens into an oval blotch that often partly obliterates the initial corridor. The frass in the blotch is black and concentrated in the basal part and along the sides.

External links
Fauna Europaea
bladmineerders.nl
A Taxonomic Revision Of The Western Palaearctic Species Of The Subgenera Zimmermannia Hering And Ectoedemia Busck s.str. (Lepidoptera, Nepticulidae), With Notes On Their Phylogeny

Nepticulidae
Moths of Europe
Moths described in 1941